Mahlezan (also Romanized as Mahlezān; also known as Mahlah Zān, Mahlan Zān, Mahlehzān, Mahl-i-zan, Makhlazan, Malhaz̄ān, and Mātāzān) is a village in Valdian Rural District, Ivughli District, Khoy County, West Azerbaijan Province, Iran. At the 2006 census, its population was 462, in 127 families.

References 

Populated places in Khoy County